David T. Isaacson is a United States Army major general who serves as the director of manpower and personnel of the Joint Staff since June 2022. He most recently served as the Chief of Staff of the United States Cyber Command. Previously, he served as the Director of Architecture, Operations, Networks, and Space of the United States Army.

References

Living people
Place of birth missing (living people)
Recipients of the Defense Superior Service Medal
Recipients of the Legion of Merit
United States Army generals
United States Army personnel of the Gulf War
United States Army personnel of the Iraq War
United States Army personnel of the War in Afghanistan (2001–2021)
Year of birth missing (living people)